Kavala (Perifereiakí Enótita Kaválas) is one of the regional units of Greece. It is part of East Macedonia and Thrace. Its capital is the city of Kavala. Kavala regional unit is the easternmost within the geographical region of Macedonia.

Geography
The Pangaio mountains, reaching 1,957 m are situated in the west. The neighbouring regional units are Serres to the west, Drama to the north and Xanthi to the east. The river Nestos flows along the eastern border. Arable lands are located along the coastline, in the north and in the east.

The regional unit has a predominantly Mediterranean climate.

Administration

The regional unit Kavala is subdivided into three municipalities. These are (number as in the map in the infobox):
Kavala (1)
Nestos (2)
Pangaio (3)

Prefecture

As a part of the 2011 Kallikratis government reform, the former Kavala Prefecture was transformed into a regional unit within the East Macedonia and Thrace region. The prefecture also included the island of Thasos, which became a separate regional unit. At the same time, the municipalities were reorganised, according to the table below.

Thasos was and remained one municipality.

Provinces
 Province of Kavala: Kavala
 Province of Pangaio: Eleftheroupoli
 Province of Nestos: Chrysoupoli
 Province of Thasos: Thasos

Note: Provinces no longer hold any legal status in Greece.

Transport
GR-2/E75, Via Egnatia, old and new, SW, Cen., E
GR-57, Cen., N
GR-69, S on the island of Thasos

See also
List of settlements in the Kavala regional unit
Slavic toponyms of places in Kavala Prefecture

References 

 
2011 establishments in Greece
Regional units of Eastern Macedonia and Thrace